The 2017 Korea Open Super Series was the seventh Super Series tournament of the 2017 BWF Super Series. The tournament took place at SK Handball Stadium in Seoul, South Korea from September 12 – 17, 2017 and had a total purse of $600,000.

Men's singles

Seeds

Top half

Bottom half

Finals

Women's singles

Seeds

Top half

Bottom half

Finals

Men's doubles

Seeds

Top half

Bottom half

Finals

Women's doubles

Seeds

Top half

Bottom half

Finals

Mixed doubles

Seeds

Top half

Bottom half

Finals

References

External links
 Tournament Link
 Schedule at www.bka.kr 
 대회개요 at koreaopen.kr 

Korea Open (badminton)
Korea Open
Korea Open
Sport in Seoul
Korea Open Super Series